Nick Podehl is an American voice actor. He has narrated more than 250 audiobooks, for which he has received 14 Earphone Awards and 2 Odyssey Award honors.

Biography 
Podehl graduated from Grand Valley State University, where he studied Communications and Theatre. While at Grand Valley State University, he performed in multiple theatre productions.

He presently lives near Grand Rapids, Michigan with his wife and two daughters.

Awards and honors

Awards

Honors

Filmography

References

External links 

 Official website

21st-century American actors
Grand Valley State University alumni
Actors from Grand Rapids, Michigan
Audiobook narrators
Year of birth missing (living people)
Living people